The Council Wars is an in-progress book series by John Ringo, published by Baen.  It is a combination of science fiction, military science fiction, and high fantasy.

The Council Wars series explores the chaos that ensues after a high tech civilization collapses on Earth. While the story uses spells and dragons, these magical items are revealed to use technology leftover from the previous generations like genetic engineering, nanotechnology, force fields, and teleportation.

Background
The series is set several thousand years in the future, in a society with advanced nanotechnology, teleportation, and other technologies which effectively are magical in the sense of Clarke's law made real, all controlled and coordinated by an artificial intelligence called Mother. Initially the world is a near Eden. War has been gone for millennia. The most aggressive, curious or adventurous humans have left Earth to explore space or terraform new worlds. The abundant power and technology allows long lives, powerful genetic engineering that includes the ability to turn into a merman or dolphin, the ability to have homes on mountain tops in the Himalayas or in deep volcanos, and free flight. Despite—or perhaps because of—an idyllic world, technology is stagnant, no great art has been produced in generations, and the human population is dropping slowly.

There are elves and dragons as in many fantasy novels. But the elves are the results of long-ago military genetic engineering programs and the dragons are genetically engineered sentients, originally designed by Disney.

Mother, who controls all the systems on Earth, as well as in near-Earth space and the Wolf 359 colonization project, is controlled by a Council of thirteen Key Holders who can change system directives and, if unanimous, change even her kernel-level programming. The Council has split into two philosophical factions, and is in a battle for whose ideals will dominate the future of the human race.  When one of the Council members dies without a clear successor to their Key, the faction split becomes numerically balanced.  That faction split leads to war: something humans have not had for over a millennium. The two factions split into open war only after the faction advocating extensive changes to society to reverse the decline in population fails to persuade the rest of the council and resorts to violence.

In the struggle for power, Mother's protocols forces her to split the available power between the voting members of the Council Members. This results in her being forced to cut off all the power to everyone else, including all the computer-controlled nanotech that have made their lives of leisure possible.  This includes explosives as well as any new power sources that may come online. Because of the protocols that are defined in her kernel-level code, Mother simply siphons off any energy above a certain level, such as an explosion, high-pressure gas, or a new hydroelectric dam etc. The result: Humanity plunges immediately from utopia to the Dark Ages. This event is known as "The Fall." The series follows the resultant chaos and destruction that follows, and the war itself. The war ends up being fought on two planes; not just with advanced technology, but with swords, cavalry, and legions.

Main characters
Herzer Herrick is the main character in the books, although he is not the only viewpoint character. Herzer is the classic "fighter" of fantasy novels: huge, muscular, skilled, and brave.

Prior to The Fall, Herzer suffered from a degenerative disorder that was destroying his muscles and his ability to control them. As a result, he was fairly emaciated, slurred his words, and twitched. Herzer's parents were unable to deal with this emotionally and effectively abandoned him, granting him his "freedom" at age fourteen. Herzer's other friends and acquaintances drifted away at the same time. Shortly before The Fall, Dr. Daneh Ghorbani was able to cure him by using nanites to essentially rebuild his entire brain, one section at a time.

Herzer has a dark side: early in There Will Be Dragons, he finds himself sexually excited by the idea of rape. Although he gets these feelings under control, he likes sexual dominance games. Herzer also enjoys the rush of combat and of victory. He doesn't specifically enjoy killing people, but he doesn't mind it.

Bast is a Wood Elf who is more than thousand years old, and possesses many supernatural abilities, including superhuman strength and speed, as well as the ability to hold breath underwater for a very long time. She becomes the lover of Herzer, and helps him come to terms with the dark side of his sexuality.

She has a playful and mischievous personality, and is very flirtatious, but also possesses wisdom and helps others in overcoming their inner demons (such as Herzer and Daneh, who suffers from the after-effects of rape). She often speaks in broken English, refers to herself in the third person, and uses strange grammar reminiscent of Yoda; this is obviously by choice (likely as a way of amusement), since she has been shown to speak normally on other occasions.

Edmund Talbot was a reenactor prior to The Fall, living his life mostly as if he were a swordsmith in the Middle Ages or the Renaissance. Edmund was known by nearly everyone in the reenactor community, to the extent that the town of Raven's Mill spontaneously sprang up around his (period) house. After The Fall, Edmund has both the skills and the equipment to survive in a pre-industrial world, and to help others to survive as well. He may well have been the only person left in the world who actually knew anything about leading troops on a sword-and-shield battlefield.

Edmund is Herzer's mentor and is often the brains directing Herzer's brawn. Edmund is well known for keeping his plans to himself.

John Ringo modeled Edmund Talbot after Charles Martel.

Daneh Ghorbani was Edmund's wife, but she left him more than ten years before The Fall. Since the fall, she has become Edmund's common-law wife (the books contain no evidence of a formal ceremony). Daneh was a doctor before The Fall, specializing in (genetic) Change-related complications. Since The Fall, she has been studying historical medical texts and re-inventing medical techniques. She is probably the best-educated doctor in Norau, if not the world.

Rachel Ghorbani is Edmund and Daneh's daughter. Rachel and Herzer attended the same school and have been friends since they were quite young; Herzer had a crush on her for all that time. However, Rachel could not deal with Herzer's illness emotionally and saw him less and less frequently before he was cured. Since The Fall, she has been training as a doctor and is now one of the most competent in Norau. Rachel is completely asexual.

Miles Arthur Rutherford or, as he is better known, "Gunny" Rutherford is one of Edmund's oldest friends, a fellow reenactor specializing at first in as a Roman Centurion, then later as a Marine Corps Gunnery Sergeant, deciding that the latter learned from the former and improved upon it. Born and raised in the lawless area known as Anarchia, and, after spending decades living as a Roman Centurion would have and at least hundred and fifty years as a Marine Gunny would live, he is tough as nails, about the hardest man introduced and the primary guiding force in Herzer's development as a Blood Lord.

Megan Travante is the daughter of Joel Travante, who runs the real spy and counter-espionage operations of the UFS. Megan was in Ropasa (present-day Europe) at the time of The Fall and survived fairly well, eventually finding work as a maid. While washing clothes in a stream, she was kidnapped by Paul Bowman for his harem. Megan eventually killed Paul, seized his key, and escaped with most of the women from the harem. When she met Herzer Herrick, they were both thunderstruck—love at first sight. By the beginning of East of the Sun, West of the Moon, Megan and Herrick are engaged to be married.

Megan's story involves many psycho-sexual aspects that mirror Herzer's. She falls in love with Paul Bowman during her time in captivity, even as she hates him. This is a case of Stockholm syndrome and links to themes in several of Ringo's books that many women supposedly want to be dominated sexually. Megan's recovery from rape trauma delays the consummation of her relationship with Herzer for a very long time.

Megan essentially supplanted Rachel Ghorbani as a viewpoint character in East of the Sun, West of the Moon.

Council Members (Key-Holders) 
There are 13 Keys in total, each separate key must be owned by only one person under no direct influence of another person, all orders to Mother (the Net's controlling A.I.) are based on majority votes of the Key-Holders. Certain rules and regulations had been enacted by earlier Councils of Key-Holders, meaning to win the war, restore the utopian society before the war, and remove the many overlapping protocols in place reducing world technology to a medieval level, all 13 Keys need to be used by one side.

New Destiny Key-Holders
Initial Key-Holders
 Paul Bowman, Leader of New Destiny; a charismatic Fascist (assassinated, Key taken by Megan Travante)
 Chansa Mulengela 
 Celine Reinshafen - genetic engineer/mad scientist
 Tetzacola Duenas (killed in initial council attack, Key taken by Sheida; presumably given to Tanisha)
 Said Dracovich (killed in initial council attack, Key taken by Ungphakorn)
 Minjie Jiaqi (assassinated and Key taken by Patala)
 Demon, lone actor

Subsequent Key-Holders
 Ragspurr (presumably given Cantor's Key)
 Reyes Cho (killed by Herzer, Key currently still on body in orbit of Planet Earth)
 Patala (assassinated by Celine on Paul's orders, Key given to Lupe)
 Lupe Ugatu
 Jassinte Arizzi

Freedom Coalition Key-Holders
Initial Key-Holders
 Sheida Ghorbani, Chairman of the Freedom Coalition
 Ungphakorn
 Ishtar
 Aikawa Gouvois
 Javalantungs Cantor (killed in initial council attack, Key "thrown" to Sheida, but implied recovered by New Destiny, given to Ragspurr)

Subsequent Key-Holders
 Tanisha (Presumably given Key of Tetzacola, or Said; resigned)
 Elnora Sill (gained Tanisha's key upon her resignation, assassinated)
 Edmund Talbot (refuses other spare Key (Tetzacola/Said) after initial council attack, but gains Elnora's key after her assassination)
 Megan Travante (took Key after killing Paul Bowman)

Neutral Key-Holder
 The Finn (initial Key holder)

Books
 There Will Be Dragons (2003) Baen Free Library book
 Emerald Sea (2004) Baen Free Library book
 Against the Tide (2005)
 East of the Sun, West of the Moon (2006)

Series Future

John Ringo has said publicly that he plans on finishing the series, but sales were relatively low for him, causing them to fall to the back burner in priority. A working title for the fifth book is On Hero's Trail.

He has also spoken of a possible sequel. Whereas the Council Wars series is the "Wizard War" common before the fall of a civilization in fantasy, the sequel would take place long after the fall. In this future time, the ramifications of the war, and the damage done to Mother have impaired the rebuilding of the world. To fix Mother would require tampering with her kernel level programing, requiring all 13 keys. As of East of the Sun, West of the Moon, one key is effectively lost for some thousands of years as it orbits the Earth. It has been suggested that only a kernel level programmer from her earliest days would be able to fix it, requiring Mother to kidnap a programmer from the past.

References

External links
Series List  on Baen website
 on SciFan

Science fiction book series
Novels by John Ringo
Military science fiction novels
Teleportation in fiction
Novels about artificial intelligence
Novels about genetic engineering
Nanotechnology in fiction
Science fantasy novels
Apocalyptic novels